Råda is a locality situated in Hagfors Municipality, Värmland County, Sweden with 448 inhabitants in 2010.

Notable people
 Robert Jansson (1889 - 1958), Swedish politician and member of the Centre Party.

References 

Populated places in Värmland County
Populated places in Hagfors Municipality